The Bulgarian Cyrillic alphabet is used to write the Bulgarian language.
The Cyrillic alphabet was originally developed in the First Bulgarian Empire during the 9th – 10th century AD at the Preslav Literary School.

It has been used in Bulgaria (with modifications and exclusion of certain archaic letters via spelling reforms) continuously since then, superseding the previously used Glagolitic alphabet, which was also invented and used there before the Cyrillic script overtook its use as a written script for the Bulgarian language. The Cyrillic alphabet was used in the then much bigger territory of Bulgaria (including most of today's Serbia), North Macedonia, Kosovo, Albania, Northern Greece (Macedonia region), Romania and Moldova, officially from 893. It was also transferred from Bulgaria and adopted by the East Slavic languages in Kievan Rus' and evolved into the Belarusian, Russian and Ukrainian alphabets and the alphabets of many other Slavic (and later non-Slavic) languages. Later, some Slavs modified it and added/excluded letters from it to better suit the needs of their own language varieties.

History

In the 9th century, the Bulgarian Empire introduced the Glagolitic alphabet, devised by Saint Cyril and Saint Methodius. The Glagolitic alphabet was gradually superseded in later centuries by the Cyrillic script, developed around the Preslav Literary School, Bulgaria at the end of the 9th century.

Several Cyrillic alphabets with 28 to 44 letters were used in the early and middle 19th century during the efforts on the codification of Modern Bulgarian until an alphabet with 32 letters, proposed by Marin Drinov, gained prominence in the 1870s: it was used until the orthographic reform of 1945, when the letters yat (uppercase , lowercase ) and yus (uppercase , lowercase ) were removed from its alphabet, reducing the number of letters to 30.  Yat was also known as "double e", and yus was also known as "big nasal sign", crossed yer, and "wide yer".

Although Bulgarian uses the Cyrillic alphabet, some letter shapes in Bulgaria were made to look more 'Latin' in the 20th century (see the pictures on the right in the article), however they are rarely used today and most typefaces don't support them.

With the accession of Bulgaria to the European Union on 1 January 2007, the Cyrillic script became the third official script of the European Union, following the Latin and Greek scripts.

List

Overview

Detailed table
The following table gives the letters of the Bulgarian alphabet, along with the IPA values for the sound of each letter. The listed transliteration in the Official transliteration column (known as the Streamlined System) is official in Bulgaria and is listed in the Official orthographic dictionary (2012). For other transliteration standards see Romanization of Bulgarian.

Most letters in the Bulgarian alphabet stand for just one specific sound. Five letters stand for sounds written in English with two or more letters.

The names of most letters are simple representations of their phonetic values, with consonants being followed by  – thus the alphabet goes:  –  – , etc.

The Bulgarian alphabet features:
 Е represents  and is called "е" .
 Yot represents .
 Щ represents  and is called "" .
 Ъ represents the vowel , and is called  ""  ('big er'). In spelling however, Ъ is referred to as  where its official label "" (used only to refer to Ъ in the alphabet) may cause some confusion.
 Ь is used on rare occasions (only after a consonant [and] before the vowel "о"), such as in the words '' (canyon), '' (driver), etc. It is called "" ('small er').

Writing

Bulgarian is usually described as having a phonemic orthography, meaning that words are spelt the way they are pronounced. This is largely true, but there are exceptions. Three of the most cited examples are:
 Voiced consonants are pronounced unvoiced when at the end of a word or when preceding an unvoiced consonant – e.g. Similarly, unvoiced consonants are pronounced voiced when preceding a voiced consonant – e.g.

Modern developments

Since the time of Bulgaria's liberation in the late 19th century, the Bulgarian language has taken on a large number of words from Western European languages. All of these are transcribed phonetically into Cyrillic, e.g.:
 French – e.g.  ( – sidewalk),  ( – corkscrew),  (from  – ground floor)
 German – e.g.  ( – bandage),  ( – digger),  ( – drill)
Notable is the transliteration of many English names through German, e.g.:
 Washington → , Scotland → 

In the years since the end of communism and the rise of technology, the tendency for borrowing has shifted mainly to English, where much computer-related terminology has entered and been inflected accordingly – again, in a wholly phonetic way. Examples include:
  – I click on the file
  – you download it onto the desktop
  – we chat on the net
The computer-related neologisms are often used interchangeably with traditional Bulgarian words, e.g.

Use of Roman script in Bulgarian

The insertion of English words directly into a Cyrillic Bulgarian sentence, while frowned upon, has been increasingly used in the media. This is done for several reasons, including –
 To shorten what would otherwise be a longer word or phrase –
  (instead of  - American)
 The Yanks oppose more US troops in Afghanistan
 To avoid the need to transcribe to Cyrillic or translate to Bulgarian well known abbreviations:
  (instead of, for example)
 We have not seen the end of SOPA, PIPA and ACTA

However, this is not always the case, as in the headline "" (official transliteration: Feysbuk vs. Gugal). Note the inconsistency here – despite the insistence on Cyrillic, the "vs." has been retained in Roman script.

The 2012 Official Orthographic Dictionary of the Bulgarian Language by the Bulgarian Academy of Sciences permits widely known proper names to remain in their original alphabet. Example sentences are given, all containing names of American IT companies: Yahoo, Microsoft, YouTube, PayPal, Facebook.

Keyboard layout

The standard Bulgarian keyboard layout for personal computers is as follows:

See also

Belarusian alphabet
Bulgarian Braille
Bulgarian language
Cyrillic script
Cyrillic script in Unicode
Cyrillic alphabets
Early Cyrillic alphabet
Greek alphabet
List of Cyrillic letters
Macedonian alphabet
Old Bulgarian
Romanization of Belarusian
Romanization of Bulgarian
Romanization of Greek
Romanization of Macedonian
Romanization of Russian
Romanization of Ukrainian
Russian alphabet
Scientific transliteration of Cyrillic
Serbian Cyrillic alphabet
Ukrainian alphabet

References

Cyrillic alphabets
Alphabet